Dogleg was an American post-hardcore band formed in Detroit, Michigan in 2015. They released their debut album, Melee in 2020 to critical acclaim. The band is fronted by Alex Stoitsiadis as lead vocalist and rhythm guitarist, with Chase Macinski on bass, Parker Grissom on guitar, and Jacob Hanlon on drums.

History 
Dogleg's origins begin in late 2015 when lead singer Alex Stoitsiadis started the project as a solo project. Stoitsiadis said of the formation that "[he] didn't really expect anything from it. I just wanted to write because there wasn't much creative freedom in my other bands I used to be in. I just felt like I couldn't write the songs I wanted to write, so I was like, I'm just going to sit down, write as many songs as I can before I don't have this space in my parents' basement anymore, record, and just put it out there and see what happens."

In 2016, Stoitsiadis moved from his hometown of Rochester Hills, Michigan to Ann Arbor to attend college at the University of Michigan. Stoitsiadis began working on and released the self-titled EP, Dogleg in 2016. The name of the EP and band is borrowed from "the greatest band to ever come from Michigan, Bear vs. Shark, and their song "Broken Dog Leg." In early 2016, Parker Grissom, who was still in high school joined Dogleg part time. Come summer 2016, Grissom joined the band full-time. The band began playing regular shows at Metal Frat, or Sigma Phi, which was a Michigan-based fraternity known for its basement shows. The same shows were where contemporaries such as Brave Bird, La Dispute, and Pity Sex began. Later that year with the new lineup, Dogleg recorded and released their second EP, Remember Alderaan?.

Throughout 2017, Dogleg began touring across Michigan, and in 2018, the band began playing shows across the Midwest, particularly in cities, such as Akron, Chicago, and Indianapolis. Later in 2018, the band represented Michigan at South by Southwest in Austin, Texas. In 2019, Dogleg signed with Triple Crown Records, which led to the band recording their first full-length album. On March 13, 2020, Dogleg released Melee, their debut album, which was met with critical acclaim.

In November 2021, the band announced they would embarking on North America tour in March/April 2022 supporting Touche Amore and Vein.fm alongside Foxtails and Thirdface on select dates.

On November 15, 2021, the band announced they would be entering a hiatus amid possessive behavior, toxic conducts in relationships and serial cheating allegations towards frontman Alex Stoitsiadis.

Discography

Studio albums 
 Melee (2020)

Extended plays 
 Dogleg (2016)
 Remember Alderaan? (2016)

Singles 
 "Fox" (2019)
 "Kawasaki Backflip" (2020)
 "Ganon Main" (2020)

References

External links 
 

2015 establishments in Michigan
Punk rock groups from Michigan
Hardcore punk groups from Michigan
Musical groups established in 2015
Musical groups from Detroit
Triple Crown Records artists
Rock music groups from Michigan